Major facilitator superfamily domain containing 2B is a protein that in humans is encoded by the MFSD2B gene.

References

Further reading